Roberto de Miranda (born 1947 in Camagüey, Cuba) is a Cuban professor and head of the College of Independent Teachers of Cuba, a non-governmental organization that he founded in July 1992. The organization seeks "the de-ideologization of education in Cuba and denounces violations against students and professors that do not share the political ideals of the system." Roberto de Miranda also founded the Félix Varela Independent Library in 2000.

He was imprisoned during the Black Spring crackdown on dissidents in 2003 and sentenced to 20 years in prison. Amnesty International declared him as a prisoner of conscience.

He received the 2003 Pedro Luis Boitel Freedom Award.

He was released after 14 months of jail, possibly because the Cuban government feared the international backlash if he had died in jail.

References

External links
Roberto de Miranda  Freedom Collection interview

1947 births
Living people
Amnesty International prisoners of conscience held by Cuba
Cuban dissidents
Cuban human rights activists
Cuban librarians
20th-century Cuban mathematicians
Nonviolence advocates
Cuban prisoners and detainees